Ixala is a genus of moths in the family Geometridae first described by George Duryea Hulst in 1896.

Ixala desperaria Hulst, 1887
Ixala proutearia Cassino, 1928
Ixala klotsi Sperry, 1940
Ixala adventaria Pearsall, 1906

References

Caberini